Eastleigh Train and Rolling Stock Maintenance Depot is a depot location in Eastleigh, Hampshire, England. The depot is situated on the South West Main Line and is near Eastleigh station. The depot code is EH.

History
In 1903, the London & South Western Railway opened a 15-road locomotive shed, it closed in 1967. A two road diesel shed was opened by British Railways opened in 1958. The main shed being a four-track dead-ended shed which was extended south in 1965, and also with a four-track through-road extension on the western side. The second building is a one-track through road shed, for fuelling, which was opened in 1998.

Around 1987, the depot's allocation consisted of Classes 08, 09 and 33 locomotives and Classes 204 and 205 DEMUs. Classes 47 and 73 could also be seen stabled at the depot.

Allocation 
As of 2018, the depot is operated by Arriva TrainCare servicing CrossCountry Class 220 and 221 Voyagers.

References

Bibliography

Eastleigh
Railway depots in England
Rail transport in Hampshire
Transport infrastructure completed in 1903